Jan D. Boersma (born 1 November 1968) is a windsurfer from the Netherlands Antilles, who won a silver medal in Men's Lechner Sailboard in the 1988 Summer Olympics, his country's first and only Olympic medal.

References

External links
 

1968 births
Living people
Dutch Antillean windsurfers
Dutch Antillean male sailors (sport)
Olympic sailors of the Netherlands Antilles
Olympic silver medalists for the Netherlands Antilles
Olympic medalists in sailing
Sailors at the 1988 Summer Olympics – Division II
Medalists at the 1988 Summer Olympics